The Nationwide Children's Hospital Championship is a golf tournament on the Korn Ferry Tour. It was played for the first time in July 2007 at The Ohio State University Golf Club's Scarlet Course in Upper Arlington, Ohio. Jack Nicklaus, a former Ohio State golfer and Upper Arlington native, serves as honorary host of the event.

The first six years of the event were unique in that it invited the top collegiate golfers to compete. Amateurs won two of the six events.

Since 2013, it is part of the Korn Ferry Tour Finals and the field consists of the top 75 players from the Korn Ferry Tour money list and the players ranked 126 to 200 on the PGA Tour's FedEx Cup points list at the start of the Finals.

The 2017 purse was $1,000,000, with a $180,000 winner's share.

Winners

Bolded golfers graduated to the PGA Tour via the Korn Ferry Tour regular-season money list, in years that the event was not part of the Korn Ferry Tour Finals. In years that the event has been part of the Finals, all winners and runners-up have earned PGA Tour cards.

References

External links

Coverage on the Korn Ferry Tour's official site

Korn Ferry Tour events
Golf in Ohio
Sports competitions in Columbus, Ohio
Recurring sporting events established in 2007
2007 establishments in Ohio